Matthew Snelling (1621–1678) was an English miniature painter.

Biography
Snelling primarily painted miniature portraits, and has works that can be found in the Victoria and Albert Museum. He worked as a limner for over 20 years. His style appears to have been an influence on the miniature painter Thomas Flatman.

References

1621 births
1678 deaths
17th-century English painters
English male painters
Portrait miniaturists